Emily Helena Curran (born August 5, 1996) is an American professional soccer player who plays as a midfielder for Houston Dash of the National Women's Soccer League (NWSL). She previously played for Portland Thorns FC in the NWSL and the Penn State women's soccer team in college.

Curran is a former United States youth international, and she was nominated for the 2016 U.S. Soccer Young Female Player of the Year award.

College career
As a freshman at Penn State, Curran started all 24 games of the 2014 season for the Nittany Lions. During a match against West Virginia, she scored a goal and provided an assist to lift the team to a 3–1 win. She finished the season having played 1,922 minutes, scored three goals and served four assists. Curran scored the game-winning goal against Wisconsin the same year.

During her sophomore year, she helped Penn State advance and win the NCAA College Cup. She scored a goal and provided an assist during the team's 4–0 victory over Ohio State in the third round of the tournament. She scored her second game-winning goal of the season in the 12th minute of a 2–0 win over West Virginia in the quarterfinals. As a midfielder, Curran played all 90 minutes in Penn State's 1–0 victory over Duke University in the College Cup Final. She ranked fourth on the team in minutes played (2,098) and finished the year with seven goals and five assists (19 points).

Personal life
Formerly Emily Ogle, Curran began using her married name in January 2023.

Honors
Penn State
 NCAA College Cup: 2015

Individual
 Big Ten Conference Freshman of the Year: 2014
 Big Ten Conference All-Freshman team: 2014
 All-Big Ten Second Team: 2015
 NSCAA All-Great Lakes region first team: 2015
 Women's College Cup All-Tournament Team: 2015
 U.S. Soccer Young Female Player of the Year  nominee: 2016

References

External links
 
 
 US Soccer Bio
 Penn State Bio

Living people
American women's soccer players
Soccer players from Ohio
1996 births
Penn State Nittany Lions women's soccer players
Women's association football midfielders
Portland Thorns FC draft picks
Portland Thorns FC players
National Women's Soccer League players
United States women's under-20 international soccer players
Houston Dash players